Hiroki Moriya was the defending champion but chose not to defend his title.

Quentin Halys won the title after defeating Calvin Hemery 6–3, 6–2 in the final.

Seeds

Draw

Finals

Top half

Bottom half

References
Main Draw
Qualifying Draw

ATP Challenger China International - Nanchang - Singles
2018 Singles